Fira Benenson (14 April 1898 – 23 October 1977) was a Russian-born American fashion designer and dressmaker. After growing up in Baku and Saint Petersburg, her family left Russia at the end of World War I and relocated in London. Benenson grew up between London, Paris and New York City, immigrating to Manhattan in the late 1920s. Opening a dress shop, she gained a reputation as a designer and was hired by Bonwit Teller in 1934. When World War II prohibited participation in the Paris fashion industry, she and other American designers began creating their own fashion lines. Leaving Bonwit's in 1948, she operated her own company, designing into 1969 and inspiring a new generation of American designers.

Early life
Fira Benenson was born on 14 April 1898 in Baku, which at the time was located in the Russian Empire, as the middle daughter of Sophia Borisovna (née Goldberg, 1862–1926) and Grigori Benenson (1860–1939), a Jewish financier and oil magnate. Her mother was born in Pinsk and her father was born in Minsk to a wealthy timber merchant and had begun his career managing his father's estates. In 1889, he moved with his wife and young son, Jacob (1885–?) to Baku, opening a rice processing plant, which was the first in the area and began exporting rice in the domestic market. Within a decade, he bought a kerosene plant and expanded his business interests into oil production. Grigory was one of the pioneer oil prospectors of the Baku fields and a chief stockholder in the Lena Gold Mining Partnership, as well as a director of the Russian and English Bank Limited of Saint Petersburg.

Berenson was raised with her older sister Flora (1895–1984) and younger sister Manya on the top floor of the home built by Pyotr Mikhailovich Volkonsky in Saint Petersburg and spent time on a country estate known as Redkino. Her father then bought a home on Nevsky Prospect, from which he operated his businesses as well and eventually installed a cinema in 1912. The following year, the business was moved to Sadovaya Street, to the building which now houses the St. Petersburg currency exchange. In 1914, while visiting in Germany, the family decided to relocate to London and moved there permanently in 1915. Grigory began investing in New York City in 1919, buying the City Investing Building. Berenson lived in Paris with her mother in the 1920s, but traveled often to New York. After her mother's death on 27 April 1926, in Nice, Benenson moved permanently to Manhattan, where on 19 March 1931, she married Janusz Ilinski, a Polish nobleman and soldier.

Career
His father's investments in real estate in New York allowed Fira to open, with her partner Vera Heller, Verben, an exclusive dress shop between 5th and 6th Avenues on 57th Street. In the mid-1920s, the women's boutique focused on classic but cutting-edge fashion for wealthy women of New York. Fira worked as a buyer and relationship builder with couture houses almost exclusively in Paris.

When the family fortune took a downturn due to the Great Depression and the aftermath of the Wall Street Crash of 1929, Benenson opened a dress shop in New York City, gaining a reputation in the fashion industry. In 1934, she was hired by Bonwit Teller to manage their Couture Salon, traveling four times a year to the fashion markets in Paris. In 1940, with travel restrictions due to the war and the German invasion of France, Paris was closed off to the industry. American designers began to create their own designs, and Benenson launched Fira Benenson Inc. Her plan was not to create haute couture fashion, but rather simple, but elegant clothing in which women could walk and sit, while wearing throughout their normal daily routines. While other designers utilized padded shoulders, Benenson preferred natural lines and silhouettes that balanced a woman's figure.

In 1946, the Hoving Corporation made a bid to purchase Bonwit's, which resulted in Benenson's resignation by 1948 to open her own shop. She had become one of the top fashion designers in the United States by 1950, and counted among her clients, Princess Grace of Monaco and Pat Nixon. Increasingly she designed clothes for women over forty, putting out two collections each year for the ready-to-wear market, while still keeping her styles though available in a range of sizes, with the feel of made to order garments. She continued designing through the end of the 1960s.

Death and legacy
Benenson died at her home at 333 East 57th Street in Manhattan on 23 October 1977. She was influential in giving a start to many young designers during her career, including George Halley and Monte Streitfield. Her sister Flora was the mother of Peter Solomon Benenson, founder of Amnesty International and her sister Manya was the noted translator of Doctor Zhivago.

Notes

References

Citations

Bibliography

 
 

  

  

 

 

 
 

 

1898 births
1977 deaths
Emigrants from the Russian Empire to the United States
Artists from New York City
American fashion designers
Jewish women